Ervin Mondt (born October 2, 1938) is a former American football coach.  He served as the head football coach at Morningside College in Sioux City, Iowa from 1983 to 1988 and South Dakota School of Mines and Technology in Rapid City, South Dakota from 1990 to 1994, compiling a career college football coaching record of 30–80–1.  Mondt also coached high school football over a span of four decades in the states of Colorado and New Mexico.  He retired from coaching in 2002.

Coaching career
Mondt was the head football coach at Morningside College in Sioux City, Iowa.  He held that position for six seasons, from 1983 to 1988.  His coaching record at Morningside was 19–46–1.

Following is his career at Morningside, he continued his career as head football coach at the South Dakota School of Mines and Technology for five seasons, from 1990 to 1994. He posted a record of 11–34 before stepping down.

Head coaching record

College

References

1938 births
Living people
Morningside Mustangs football coaches
North Dakota Fighting Hawks football coaches
South Dakota Mines Hardrockers football coaches
Wyoming Cowboys football coaches
High school football coaches in Colorado
High school football coaches in Iowa
High school football coaches in New Mexico
Junior college football coaches in the United States
University of Colorado Boulder alumni
People from Weld County, Colorado
Coaches of American football from Colorado